Taragmarcha laqueata is a moth of the family Oecophoridae.  It is endemic on the island of Mauritius.

It has a wingspan of 17mm, head and thorax are dark glossy fuscous, palpi white. Antennae whitish, ringed with dark fuscous. The abdomen is grey. Forewings are elongated, rather dark glossy fuscous, with a white streak along basal third of costa. Hindwings are dark grey

Another species, Taragmarcha borbonensis,  from the neighboring island of La Réunion had originally been designated as a subspecies of T. laqueata.

References

Oecophoridae
Moths described in 1910
Moths of Mauritius
Endemic fauna of Mauritius